Kottathara is a village in the Sholayur grama panchayat of Palakkad district in Kerala state, India.  It was earlier part of Mannarkkad taluk prior to the formation of Attappady taluk.

Demographics
As of 2011 Census, Kottathara village had a population of 10,195 with 5,072 males and 5,123 females. Kottathara had overall literacy of 70.9% lower than state average of 94%; male literacy was 76.6% and female literacy was 65.3%.

References

Villages in Palakkad district